Endotricha persicopa is a species of snout moth in the genus Endotricha. It was described by Edward Meyrick in 1889.

Subspecies
Endotricha persicopa persicopa (New Guinea, New Ireland, Goodenough Island, Buru)
Endotricha persicopa paliolata Hampson, 1916 (St. Aignans, Rossell Island, Sudest Island)

References

Moths described in 1889
Endotrichini